Christopher Don Seelbach (born December 18, 1972) is a former Major League Baseball pitcher who played for the Atlanta Braves from -. He was hit on the head by Houston Astros first baseman Lance Berkman. He was immediately taken off the field and sent to the hospital. He did recover.
 
Seelbach now owns and operates Hit Run Steal, a baseball and softball equipment company.
 


Biography
Christopher Seelbach was born on Monday, December 18, 1972, in Lufkin, Texas. Seelbach was 27 years old when he broke into the big leagues on September 9, 2000, with the Atlanta Braves
 
Seelbach was drafted by the Braves in the 4th round of the 1991 MLB Draft out of Lufkin High School in Lufkin, TX.  Chris also received a baseball scholarship from Mississippi State, but elected to sign with the Braves.  
 
Chris spent 5 years with the Braves organization (reaching AAA) before being traded to the Florida Marlins.  After 2 years with the Marlins and short stint with the Seattle Mariners organization, Chris returned to the Braves and reached the Major Leagues in 2000 and 2001.  
 
Following his time with the Braves, Chris signed with Nippon-Ham Fighters of the NPB and spent 2 years with the team.
 
Seelbach is a former owner/advisor of 80/20 Baseball, which offers online coaching from professionals with MLB experience.
 
He now owns and operates Hit Run Steal, a manufacturer and distributor of professional baseball and softball equipment.  Hit Run Steal's website also features online pitching classes and tips from Seelbach and other professional baseball players.

External links
, or Pura Pelota (Venezuelan Winter League)

References

 

1972 births
Living people
American expatriate baseball players in Japan
Atlanta Braves players
Baseball players from Texas
Charlotte Knights players
Durham Bulls players
Greenville Braves players
Gulf Coast Braves players
Macon Braves players
Major League Baseball pitchers
Nippon Ham Fighters players
Orlando Rays players
People from Lufkin, Texas
Richmond Braves players
Tacoma Rainiers players
Tiburones de La Guaira players
American expatriate baseball players in Venezuela